Sasa is a Samoan word for a particular group dance. The sasa can be performed by both males and females in a seated position or standing. Hand movements are used to depict activities taken from everyday life.

History 

The word sasa  literally means 'to strike'. The dance was originally a village activity, but it soon became one of Samoa's most well-known dances. It was traditionally performed by whole villages in order to give a perfect effect on the viewers- the more performers, the more the dance became effective.

Sa'a is cognate with other words found across Polynesia often used to describe local dance forms, such as Māori haka, Hawaiian ha'a, etc.

The Sasa requires synchronization, energy and enthusiasm.

Performance 

Generally, the sasa is performed by a large group of people, it is normally performed sitting down, but there are parts of the dance which require the group to stand up. The movements depict everyday life, from the movement of fish in the water, to the flying birds in the sky, from cooking the umu to cleaning the house, and even a form of voyaging, where the group move into the form of a large canoe, having the arms on the outside mimic the movement of paddles in the water.

Every Sasa is different, some movements have never changed, however nowadays, more contemporary moves are now being added to the Sasa. The Samoa 'ava ceremony is always included in the Sasa where the group would mimic the Taupou making 'ava.

A Sasa will always begin with the fa'aluma yelling tulolo which tells the group to bow their heads, and nofo for the group to sit up again, in a Sasa you will hear chants like "Talofa" (greetings) at the beginning and "Tofa" (farewell) at the end or easier, fa.

References

Samoan dances
Samoan words and phrases